In Portuguese middle-schools, a five-point grading scale is used, where:

 5 (very good or excellent) is the best possible grade (90-100%),
 4 (good) (70-89%),
 3 (satisfactory) indicates "average" performance (50-69%),
 2 (unsatisfactory) (20-49%),
 1 (poor) is the lowest possible grade (0-19%). 

In high-schools and universities, a 20-point grading scale is used. When it is the case of the final grade of an academic degree, each grade is assigned a qualitative mark by degree:

References 

Portugal
Grading
Grading